The Sparrow's Fluttering is a 1988 Italian romance drama film directed by Gianfranco Mingozzi.

The theme song "Felicità" by Lucio Dalla and Mauro Malavasi won the David di Donatello for best original song.

Cast 

Philippe Noiret as Gabriele Battistini
Ornella Muti as Silvana
 Nicola Farron as The Young Man 
 Chiara Argelli as  Gabriele's Wife
Claudine Auger as  Dino's Widow 
Sabrina Ferilli as  the woman of the stars 
 Beppe Chierici as  Parroco

See also        
 List of Italian films of 1988

References

External links

1988 films
Italian romantic drama films
1988 romantic drama films
Films directed by Gianfranco Mingozzi
Films with screenplays by Tonino Guerra
1980s Italian films
1980s Italian-language films